Old Elm GO Station (formerly Lincolnville) is a train and bus station in the GO Transit network located in Whitchurch-Stouffville, Ontario, Canada. Old Elm is the northeastern terminus of train service on the Stouffville line. The station opened on September 2, 2008, after some delay; it had initially been projected to open the preceding June.

Station name

The station was referred to by the provisional name of Stouffville North before adopting the Lincolnville name partway through construction. Historically, Lincolnville is the name of a hamlet which was located at the corner of Bloomington Road and Highway 47 (Old Concession 10 Road), divided between the townships of Uxbridge to the east and Whitchurch to the west. On October 16, 2021, the station was renamed Old Elm GO after an elm tree on the premises of the future station site.

History

Lincolnville station was built to relieve the line's previous terminus, Stouffville GO Station, which is located in Stouffville proper; it could not expand its parking and had limited bus interchange capabilities. Constructed next to the existing Stouffville layover facility at 10th Line and Bethesda Road, Lincolnville station cost $5.5million and extended passenger service approximately  farther from Union Station in Toronto. The station's park-and-ride catchment includes much of the municipality of Uxbridge, and it is seen as a precursor to eventual GO Train service to the townsite of Uxbridge proper. From 2010 to 2011, 410 additional parking spots were built, along with a bus storage facility and crew centre.

The adjacent layover facility was completed in October 2019. The station will be redeveloped starting in 2021, with a targeted completion set for 2022.

Bus connections
70–71 GO Bus: Northbound to Goodwood and Uxbridge and southbound to Union Station.
There is no local York Region Transit bus service.

See also
 Uxbridge railway station (Ontario)

References

External links

GO Transit railway stations
Buildings and structures in Whitchurch-Stouffville
Transport in Whitchurch-Stouffville
Railway stations in the Regional Municipality of York
Railway stations in Canada opened in 2008
2008 establishments in Ontario